José Alexander Riasco Brizuela (born 2 February 2004) is a Venezuelan footballer who plays as a forward for Philadelphia Union II.

Club career
Riasco signed for the Philadelphia Union in 2022 for a $1 million fee.

Career statistics

Club

Notes

References

2004 births
Living people
People from Ciudad Guayana
Venezuelan footballers
Venezuela youth international footballers
Association football forwards
Venezuelan Primera División players
Deportivo La Guaira players
Philadelphia Union II players
Venezuelan expatriate footballers
Venezuelan expatriate sportspeople in the United States
Expatriate soccer players in the United States
MLS Next Pro players